Kresh is the name of an ethnic minority in South Sudan, Sudan, and the Central African Republic. The Kresh speak various Kresh languages of the Nilo-Saharan phylum.

References 

Ethnic groups in the Central African Republic
Ethnic groups in Sudan